Salvia balansae a perennial plant species of the family Lamiaceae. It is native to Algeria.

References

balansae
Flora of Algeria